Ghent University (abbreviated as UGent) is a public research university located in Ghent, Belgium. 

Established before the state of Belgium itself, the university was founded by the Dutch King William I in 1817, when the region was incorporated into the United Kingdom of the Netherlands after the fall of First French Empire. In that same year, he founded two other universities for the southern provinces as well, alongside Ghent University: University of Liège and State University of Leuven. 

After the Belgian revolution of 1830, the newly formed Belgian state began to administer Ghent University. In 1930, UGent became the first Dutch-speaking university in Belgium. Previously, French (and, even earlier, Latin) had been the standard academic language in what was Université de Gand. In 1991, it was granted major autonomy and changed its name accordingly from State University of Ghent (abbreviated as RUG) to its current designation.

Located in Flanders, Ghent is one of the largest Belgian universities, consisting of 44,000 students and 9,000 staff members. The university also supports the Ghent University Library (including the famous Boekentoren) and the Ghent University Hospital, which is one of the biggest hospitals in Belgium. In addition to satellite campuses elsewhere in Flanders and a Global Campus in Songdo, South Korea, Ghent University maintains many inter-university partnerships and programs both inside and outside of Europe.  

An avowedly research-driven and socially minded university, UGent consistently rates among the top 100 universities in the world. It is one of the greatest beneficiaries of funding from the Flemish research council. It was also among the Top 30 recipients of major research grants awarded by the European Research Council under the funding framework Horizon 2020 (2014–2020).

History

Foundation in the 19th century 
Ghent was one of the largest and most important cities of Europe in the medieval period. 

The university in Ghent was opened on 9 October 1817, with JC van Rotterdam  as the first rector. The foundation of universities in Ghent, Liege, and Leuven that year – by the Dutch King William I – was part of a larger policy to stimulate academic lag across the southern provinces of the United Kingdom of the Netherlands (which would later become Belgium). The original four faculties comprised Humanities (Letters), Law, Medicine, and Science, with the language of instruction being Latin. In the first year, it had 190 students and 16 professors. 

In the wake of the Belgian Revolution, of 1830, the number of students declined, having peaked at 414. Although the faculties of humanities and science were dissolved from the university, they were restored five years later, in 1835. At this time, French also became the language of instruction, taking the place of Latin. 

Ghent University played a role in the foundation of modern organic chemistry. Friedrich August Kekulé unraveled the structure of benzene at Ghent and Adolf von Baeyer (Johann Friedrich Wilhelm Adolf von Baeyer), a student of August Kekulé, made contributions to organic chemistry. 

In 1882, Sidonie Verhelst became the first female student at Ghent University, in science and pharmacology.

Developments in the 20th century 
In 1903, the Flemish politician Lodewijk De Raet led a successful campaign to begin instruction in Dutch, and the first courses were begun in 1906. 

During World War I, the occupying German administration conducted Flamenpolitik and turned Ghent University into the first Dutch-speaking university in Belgium. A Flemish Institute (Vlaemsche Hoogeschool), commonly known as Von Bissing University, was founded in 1916 but was disestablished after the war and French language was fully reinstated. In 1923, Cabinet Minister Pierre Nolf put forward a motion to definitively establish the university as a Dutch-speaking university, and this was realized in 1930. August Vermeylen served as the first rector of a Dutch-language university in Belgium.In the Second World War, the German administration of the university attempted to create a German orientation, removing faculty members and installing loyal activists.
In the postwar period, Ghent University became a much larger institution, following government policy of democratizing higher education in Flanders during the 1950s and 1960s. By 1953, there were more than 3,000 students, and by 1969 more than 11,500. 

The number of faculties increased to eleven, starting with Applied Sciences in 1957. It was followed by Economics and Veterinary Medicine in 1968, Psychology and Pedagogy, as well as Bioengineering, in 1969, and Pharmaceutical Sciences. 

In the 1960s, there were several student demonstrations at Ghent University, notably around the Blandijn site, which houses the Faculty of Arts & Philosophy. The most severe of demonstrations took place in 1969 in the wake of May 1968.

Since the end of the Cold War 
In 1991, the university officially changed its name from Rijksuniversiteit Gent (RUG) to Universiteit Gent (UGent), following an increased grant of autonomy by the government of the Flemish Community. The faculty of Politics and Social Sciences is the most recent addition, in 1992.

Academic profile

Organisation and structure 
Ghent University consists of eleven faculties with over 130 individual departments. In addition, the university maintains the Zwijnaarde science park and Greenbridge science park.

List of faculties 
 Faculty of Arts and Philosophy
 Faculty of Bio-science Engineering
 Faculty of Law
 Faculty of Sciences
 Faculty of Medicine and Health Sciences
 Faculty of Engineering and Architecture
 Faculty of Economics and Business Administration
 Faculty of Veterinary Medicine
 Faculty of Psychology and Educational Sciences
 Faculty of Pharmaceutical Sciences
 Faculty of Political and Social Sciences

Library 
Standing on the Blandijnberg, the Boekentoren houses the Ghent University Library, which contains nearly 3 million volumes. The university library has joined the Google Books Library Project. Among other notable collections, it preserves Papyrus 30, an early manuscript of the Greek New Testament.

The university is also a partner in the development of De Krook, the new public library and media center in the center of Ghent, opened in 2017.

Reputation & rankings 

Ghent University consistently ranks among the top 100 universities in the world and, alongside the Catholic University of Leuven, the best in Belgium. In 2017, it was ranked, globally, 69th by the Academic Ranking of World Universities (or Shanghai ranking) and 125th by QS World University Rankings. For 2021, Ghent University has been ranked, worldwide, 85th by U.S. News & World Report and 96th by Times Higher Education.

International relations 

The university maintains many partnerships within Belgium, across Europe, and throughout the world. 

Inside Belgium, Ghent University supports the Belgian Co-ordinated Collections of Micro-organisms and the Vlaams Instituut voor Biotechnologie. 

Within Europe, it is a member of the Santander Network, the Enlight (previously  the U4) Network, and the 3i University Network. It also participates in the Conference of European Schools for Advanced Engineering Education and Research. In addition, the university cooperates with numerous universities for the Erasmus and Erasmus Mundus programs; within the framework of the latter, it heads the International Master of Science in Rural Development and the International Master of Science in Soils and Global Change (IMSOGLO).

Beyond Europe, Ghent University conducts exchange programs on all six continents. Frameworks include its campus in South Korea and its 3C Partnership.

Associated contributions and innovations 
Ghent University has been instrumental in the development of COinS and Unipept.

Gallery

People

Notable alumni 

 Joseph Antoine Ferdinand Plateau (1801-1883), physicist, mathematician
 Abdoel Rivai (1871-1937), physician, journalist, the first native of the dutch east indies to obtain doctoral degree
 Leo Apostel (1925–1995), philosopher
 Leo Baekeland (1863–1944), chemist, inventor of Bakelite
 Wim Blockmans (born 1945), historian
 Thierry Bogaert, founder of DevGen
 Luc Bossyns, civil engineer
 Marc Bossuyt (born 1944), judge, professor
 Dries Buytaert (born 1978), computer scientist, founder of the Drupal CMS
 Robert Cailliau (born 1947), co-inventor of the World Wide Web
 Luc Coene (1947–2017), economy, governor of the National Bank of Belgium (NBB)
 Marc Coucke (born 1965), co-founder of Omega Pharma
 Martin De Prycker (born 1955), engineer
 Bertha De Vriese (1877–1958), first woman to enroll and graduate as a physician
 Franz Cumont (1868–1947), historian
  (1922–1992), gynecologist, best known as chocolate maker of the brands Leonidas and Daskalidès.
 Bert De Graeve (born 1955), law, businessman
 Michel de Kemmeter, author and researcher in human sustainable development
 Rudy Dekeyser, molecular biologist, assistant director of the VIB
 Arnoud De Meyer (presently) director of Judge Business School of the University of Cambridge
 Wim De Waele, economy and computer science, director of the IBBT
 Catherine de Zegher (born 1955), international curator, art critic, and art historian
 Martin Dobelle (1906–1986), veteran orthopedic surgeon
 Yaakov Dori (1899–1973), first chief of staff of the Israeli Defense Forces, president of the Technion – Israel Institute of Technology
 Paul Fredericq (1850–1920), historian
 Walter Fiers (1931–2019), molecular biologist
 Leopold Flam (1912–1995), historian, philosopher
 Dirk Frimout (born 1941), physicist, astronaut
 Derrick Gosselin (born 1956), engineer, economist, business manager
 Joseph Guislain (1797–1860), physiologist and psychiatrist
 Jacques-Joseph Haus (1796–1881), jurist
 Lucienne Herman-Michielsens (1926–1995), law, politician
 Philippe Herreweghe (born 1947), doctor, psychiatrist, orchestra conductor
 Corneille Heymans (1892–1968), physiologist (Nobel prize winner)
 Jan Hoet, (1936–2014), art historian, museum director, founding director of the SMAK
 Mark Janse (born 1959), classicist and linguist
 Friedrich August Kekulé von Stradonitz (1829–1896), chemist
 Jaap Kruithof (1929–2009), philosopher
 Tom Lanoye (born 1958), philologist, writer
 François Laurent (1810–1887), jurist
 Marguerite Legot (1913–1977), jurist, first Belgian woman to serve as a government minister
 Yves Leterme (born 1960), prime minister of Belgium
 Emma Leclercq (1851–1933), cell biologist
 Herman Liebaers (1919–2010), writer, former Marschal of the Royal Household.
 Suzanne Lilar (born Suzanne Verbist) (1901–1992), philosopher, jurist, essayist, novelist
 Julius Mac Leod (1857–1919), botanist
 Maurice Maeterlinck (1862–1949), jurist, writer (Nobel prize winner)
 Hélène Mallebrancke (1902–1940), first female Belgian civil engineer to graduate from the University of Ghent, Resistance member in Second World War
 Paul Mansion (1844–1919), mathematician
 Rudi Mariën, pharmacy, chairman of Innogenetics
 Gerard Mortier (1943–2014), artistic director
 Roland Peelman, conductor and musical director
 Jean-Pierre Nuel (1847–1920), physiologist
 Peter Piot (born 1949), doctor, assistant secretary-general of the United Nations
 Henri Pirenne (1862–1935), historian
 Karel Poma (1920–2014), chemist and politician
 Ockert Potgieter (1965-2021), missionary and film director
 Adolphe Quetelet (1796–1874), statistician
 Godfried-Willem Raes (born 1952), composer, performer and instrument maker
 Jacques Rogge (1942–2021), doctor, president of the International Olympic Committee
 Gustave Rolin-Jaequemyns (1835–1902), jurist, diplomat and cofounder of the Institut de droit international
 Jozef Schell (1935–2003), molecular biologist
 Ferdinand Augustijn Snellaert (1809–1872), physician and writer
 Luc Van den Bossche (born 1947), law, politician
 Guido van Gheluwe (1926–2014), jurist and founder of the Orde van den Prince
 Herman Vanderpoorten (1922–1984), politician
 Hugo Van Heuverswyn (born 1948) chemist, biotech pioneer and businessman
 Ann Van Gysel, zoology
 Dirk Van de Put, businessman, incoming CEO of Mondelez International
 Karel van de Woestijne (1878–1929), writer
 Henry van de Velde (1863–1957), architect
 Alexander Van Dijck, pioneer in rare diseases
 Prudens van Duyse (1804–1859), writer
 Paul van Geert (born 1950), psychologist
 Marc Van Montagu (born 1933), biotech pioneer
 Désiré van Monckhoven (1934–1882), physicist
 Jules Van Praet (1806–1887), statesman
 Willy van Ryckeghem (born 1935), economist
 Piet Vanthemsche (born 1955), veterinary surgeon
 Daniel Varoujan (1884–1915), Armenian poet
 Guy Verhofstadt (born 1953), former prime minister of Belgium, liberal European politician
 Dirk Verhofstadt (born 1955), publisher
 Etienne Vermeersch (1934–2019), philosopher
 Katrien Vermeire (born 1979), artist
 André Vlerick (1919–1990), economy
 Emile Waxweiler (1867–1916), engineer and sociologist
 Marc Zabeau (born 1949), zoology

Notable faculty 

 S.N. Balagangadhara (born 1952), comparative science of cultures
 George de Hevesy (1885–1966), Nobel Prize winner, Chemistry
 François Laurent (1810–1887), historian and jurisconsult
 Jan De Maeseneer (born 1952), medicine, family medicine
 Georges De Moor (born 1953), medicine, medical informatics
 Walter Fiers (1931-2019), molecular biologist
 Corneille Heymans (1892–1968), physiologist (Nobel prize winner)
 Joseph Plateau (1801–1883), physicist
 Xavier Saelens (born 1965), biotechnology
 Jeff Schell (1935–2003), biotech pioneer
 Erwin Schrödinger (1887–1961), physicist (Nobel Prize winner),  visiting scholar
 Johan Rudolf Thorbecke (1798–1872), statesman
 Marc Van Montagu (born 1933), biotech pioneer
 August Vermeylen (1872–1945), author, art historian, statesman
 Adolf von Baeyer (1835–1917), chemist (Nobel prize winner), visiting scholar
 August Kekulé (1829–1896), chemist

Rectors

 1817–1818: Jean Charles Van Rotterdam
 1818–1819: 
 1819–1820: Jean Baptiste Hellebaut
 1820–1821: 
 1821–1822: François Egide Verbeeck
 1822–1823: Jean Guillaume Garnier
 1823–1824: Pierre De Ryckere
 1824–1825: Louis Vincent Raoul
 1825–1826: Jacques Louis Kesteloot
 1826–1827: Jean Charles Hauff
 1827–1828: Jacques Joseph Haus
 1828–1829: Pierre Lammens
 1829–1830: 
 1830–1831: Jacques Van Breda
 1831–1832: Leopold Auguste Warnkoenig
 1832–1833: François Verbeeck
 1833–1834: Jacques Joseph Haus
 1834–1835: Jacques Louis Kesteloot
 1835–1838: Jacques Joseph Haus
 1838–1839: Philippe Auguste De Rote
 1839–1840: 
 1840–1841: Jean Timmermans
 1841–1842: Josephus Nelis
 1842–1843: Georg Wilhelm Rassmann
 1843–1844: Charles Van Coetsem
 1844–1845: Marie-Charles Margerin
 1845–1846: Jean-Baptiste Minne-Barth
 1846–1847: Joseph Roulez
 1847–1848: François Verbeeck
 1848–1852: Eloi Manderlier
 1852–1855: 
 1855–1857: Constant-Philippe Serrure
 1857–1864: Joseph Roulez
 1864–1867: Jacques Joseph Haus
 1867–1870: 
 1870–1873: Joseph Jean Fuerison
 1873–1879: 
 1879–1885: 
 1885–1887: Jean-Jacques Kickx
 1887–1891: Gustave Wolters
 1891–1894: Adhémar Motte
 1894–1897: Charles Van Cauwenberghe
 1897–1900: Polynice Van Wetter
 1900–1903: 
 1903–1906: 
 1906–1909: Hector Leboucq
 1909–1912: 
 1912–1915: Henri Schoentjes
 1916–1918: Pierre Hoffmann
 1918–1919: Henri Schoentjes
 1919–1921: Henri Pirenne
 1921–1923: Eugène Eeman
 1923–1924: Jean-François Heymans
 1924–1927: 
 1927–1929: Camille De Bruyne
 1929–1930: 
 1930–1933: August Vermeylen
 1933–1936: 
 1936–1938: 
 1938–1939: Jean Haesaert
 1939–1941: René Goubau
 1940–1944: 
 1944–1947: 
 1947–1950: 
 1950–1953: 
 1953–1957: 
 1957–1961: 
 1961–1969: 
 1969–1973: 
 1973–1977: 
 1977–1981: 
 1981–1985: 
 1985–1993: 
 1993–2001: 
 2001–2005: Andreas De Leenheer
 2005–2013: Paul Van Cauwenberge
 2013–2017: 
 2017–2021:

Recipients of honorary doctorates

 J. G. ten Houten, Wageningen Agricultural University, Agricultural Sciences
 Mary Beard, University of Cambridge, Classics (2021)

See also 

 
 Belgian Co-ordinated Collections of Micro-organisms (BCCM)
 Flanders Interuniversity Institute of Biotechnology (VIB)
 Ghent Bio-Energy Valley
 Ghent University Hospital (UZ Gent)
 Ghent University Museum (GUM)
 Greenbridge science park
 Interuniversity Microelectronics Centre (IMEC)
 Open access in Belgium
 Science and technology in Flanders
 University Foundation
 Zwijnaarde science park
 List of modern universities in Europe (1801–1945)
 List of universities in Belgium
 List of Jesuit sites

Notes and references

External links
 

 
Universities in Belgium
Forestry education
Educational institutions established in 1817
Engineering universities and colleges in Belgium
Forestry in Belgium
1817 establishments in the Netherlands
William I of the Netherlands